Beck Center for the Arts in Lakewood, Ohio, is a non-profit, performing arts and arts education organization.  It is the largest theater and arts center on Cleveland's West Shore, educating  and entertaining over 65,000 people per year. On its 3½ acre campus, Beck Center houses two stages producing live theater for children, teens and adults; two gallery spaces, and over thirty classrooms for educational programming for children and adults. It offers classes in visual arts, music, theater and dance.

The Beck Center was originally named the "Guild of the Masques" when it was founded by Richard Kay in 1929; formally incorporating as the Lakewood Little Theatre in 1933. The group moved onto its current site in Lakewood, Ohio in a theater originally designed for the movies, the Lucier, in 1938. They redesigned the interior space for live plays and purchased the building in 1943. In the following decades, the group bought up contiguous land, and, in 1972 began a capital campaign to build a new center. They were successful in raising $600,000 which was matched by ad exec Kenneth C. Beck and the current Beck Center was built in 1975.

Beck Center for the Arts hosts the longest running youth theater program in the United States, running for nearly seventy years.

Productions

2022-2023 Season Professional Theater

2021-2022 Season Professional Theater

2021- 2022 Season Youth Theater

2020-2021 Season Professional Theater

2020-2021 Season Youth Theater

2019-2020 Season Professional Theater

2019-2020 Season Youth Theater

2018-2019 Season Professional Theater

2018-2019 Season Youth Theater Presented by the Mort and Iris Philanthropic Fund

2017-2018 Season Professional Theater

2017-2018 Season Youth Theater Presented by the Mort and Iris Philanthropic Fund

2016-2017 Season Professional Theater

2016-2017 Season Youth Theater Presented by the Mort and Iris Philanthropic Fund

2015-2016 Season Professional Theater

2015-2016 Season Youth Theater

2014-2015 Season Professional Theater

2014-2015 Season Youth Theater

2013-2014 Season Professional Theater

2013-2014 Season Youth Theater

2009-2010 Season Youth Theater

References

External links
  Beck Center's official website
  A wiki about the Beck Center

Drama schools in the United States
Arts centers in Ohio
Theatres in Ohio
Performing arts centers in Ohio
Lakewood, Ohio
Buildings and structures in Cuyahoga County, Ohio
Tourist attractions in Cuyahoga County, Ohio